The 1932 All-Ireland Senior Hurling Championship Final was the 45th All-Ireland Final and the culmination of the 1932 All-Ireland Senior Hurling Championship, an inter-county hurling tournament for the top teams in Ireland. The match was held at Croke Park, Dublin, on 4 September 1932, between Kilkenny and Clare. The Munster champions lost to their Leinster opponents on a score line of 3-3 to 2-3.

Match details

1
All-Ireland Senior Hurling Championship Finals
Clare county hurling team matches
Kilkenny county hurling team matches
All-Ireland Senior Hurling Championship Final
All-Ireland Senior Hurling Championship Final, 1932